= 2024–25 Armenian Women's Basketball League =

Women's basketball league in Armenia

Armenian Women's Basketball League
- Season: 2024–25
- Dates: Regular season: 17 December 2024 – 9 March 2025; Play Offs: 10–14 March 2025
- Games played: 23
- Teams: 5

Regular season
- Season MVP: (Armenia) Meri Grigoryan

Finals
- Champions: Yerevan Foxes (3rd title)
- Runners-up: Hatis
- Finals MVP: (Armenia) Astghik Movsesyan

Statistical leaders
Points	(Armenia) Rima Manukyan	20.9
Rebounds	(Armenia) Luiza Karamyan	18.9
Assists	(Armenia) Astghik Movsesyan	5.6
Steals	(Armenia) Rima Manukyan	7.7
Blocks	(Armenia) Sona Abasyan	0.8

The 2024–25 Armenian Women's Basketball League is the top division women's basketball league in Armenia. It starts in December 2024 with the first round of the regular season and ends in March 2025.

Yerevan Foxes are the defending champions.

Yerevan Foxes won their third title after beating Hatis in the final.

== Format ==
Each team plays each other twice. The top four teams qualify for the play offs, where every round is held as one-off games.

== Regular season ==
Pos	Team	Pld	W	L	PF	PA	PD	Pts	Qualification
1	Yerevan Foxes	7	6	1	476	330	+146	13	Play Offs
2	Hatis	8	6	2	502	368	+134	14	Play Offs
3	Gyumri	8	4	4	372	461	−89	12	Play Offs
4	HAT	8	3	5	425	466	−41	11	Play Offs
5	Artsakh	7	0	7	271	421	−150	7	

Source: Armenian Women's Basketball League
Rules for classification: 1) Points; 2) Points difference; 3) Points scored.

== Play offs ==
Semi-finals
1	Yerevan Foxes	64
4	HAT	50
2	Hatis	83
3	Gyumri	46

Final
1	Yerevan Foxes	64
2	Hatis	56
Third place
4	HAT	48
3	Gyumri	66

Champions of Armenia

Yerevan Foxes
Third title
